Nykøbing Falster Håndboldklub (Nykøbing Falster Handball Club) is a Danish handball club from Nykøbing Falster. In the 2022–23 season, it played in the Danish Women's Handball League. They have a local rivalry with fellow Zealand team København Håndbold.

Kits

Results
Danish Championship 
Gold: 2017
Danish Cup
Winner: 2018
Runners-up: 2020
Danish Super Cup:
Winner: 2017
EHF Cup:
Semifinalist: 2017

Team

Current squad
Squad for the 2022–23 season.
  

Goalkeepers
 12  Annika Fríðheim Petersen
 16  Louise Egestorp
 32  Cecilie Greve
Wingers
LW
 4  Sofie Alnor
 23  Elma Halilcevic
RW
 10  Charlotte Lund Mikkelsen
 24  Sofie Olsen
Line players
 27  Liv Navne
 34  Sofie Bardrum
 44  Nikita van der Vliet

Back players
LB
 8  Stine Eiberg Jørgensen
 9  Tyra Axnér
 15  Sofie Flader
CB
 7  Amalie Wulff
 20  Mia Svele
 79  Kristina Kristiansen (c)
RB
 18  Alberte Kielstrup Madsen
 25  Marie Hélène Sajka

Technical staff
  Head Coach: Jakob Larsen
  Assistant coach: Kasper Jensen
  Goalkeeping coach: Mette Iversen Sahlholdt
  Team Leader: Britta Carstensen
  Team Leader: Per Knudsen
  Masseur: Klaus Frederiksen
  Physiotherapist: Philippa Jones

Transfers
Transfers for the season 2023–24

 Joining
  Matilde Vestergaard (LW) (from  HH Elite)
  Caroline Aar Jakobsen (P) (from  Byåsen HE) 

 Leaving
  Elma Halilcevic (LW) (to  Odense Håndbold) 
  Nikita van der Vliet (P)  (to  Odense Håndbold) 
  Mia Svele (CB) (to  Storhamar HE)

Previous squads

Former players

  Camilla Fangel (2012–2015)
  Rikke Iversen (2012–2014)
  Mia Møldrup (2012–2015)
  Cecilie Woller (2012–2015)
  Althea Reinhardt (2007–2015)
  Berit Kristensen (1997–1999)
  Mette Iversen Sahlholdt (2013–2017)
  Mette Gravholt (2015–2017)
  Mie Sørensen (2017–2018)
  Celine Lundbye Kristiansen (2016–2018)
  Line Skak (2018–2019)
  Sarah Iversen (2009–2012) (2016–2018)
  Marianne Florman (2005)
  Pernille Holmsgaard (2016–2017)
  Matilde Kondrup Nielsen (2017–2020)
  Lærke Nolsøe (2016–2021)
  Elaine Gomes (2014–2016)
  Mayara Moura (2014–2015)
  Karoline de Souza (2014–2016)
  Bárbara Arenhart (2015–2016)
  Mariana Costa (2015–2017)
  Deonise Fachinello (2016)
  Anna Lagerquist (2017–2020)
  Angelica Wallén (2017–2020)
  Nathalie Hagman (2016–2017)
  Emelie Nykvist (2015–2020)
  Ayaka Ikehara (2017–2020)
  Yui Sunami (2018–2019)
  Sakura Hauge (2018–2019)
  Tiril Merg (2017–2018)
  Dione Housheer (2018–2021)

Statistics

Top scorers in the EHF Champions League 
(All-Time) – Last updated on 2 October 2021

European record 
EHF Champions League

EHF European League

Stadium
Name: Nykøbing F. Hallen (Sponsorname: LÅNLET Arena)
City: Nykøbing Falster
Capacity: 1,300
Address: Nørre Boulevard 4 A, Nykøbing Falster

References

External links
Official homepage 

Danish handball clubs